AM Gold may refer to:
 AM Gold (album), 2022 album by Train
 AM Gold (Time-Life Music), a series of compilation albums made by Time-Life
 Gold 1530AM
 Classic Gold 954/1530 AM

See also
 Gold (The Fucking Am album)